Bury Me a G can refer to:
 A song by Thug Life from the album Thug Life: Volume 1
 A single by Young Jeezy from the album The Inspiration